Zombie Brigade is a 1988 Australian film directed by Carmelo Musca and Barrie Pattison and starring John Moore and Gerry Farron. It was shot in Toodyay, Western Australia.

Premise
In a small country town, Mayor Ransom buys up land to develop a theme park. Council officials blast a Vietnam War memorial, unleashing monsters.

Production
The script was written originally by Barrie Pattison who brought it to Carmelo Musca, who liked the idea of doing a genre piece with some social commentary. The state funding body Screen West refused to invest in the film.

Reception
According to the filmmakers, "the film made back money four or five times over for the investors".

References

External links
Blog Review at The Worst of Perth

Zombie Brigade at Britannica Blog
Zombie Brigade at Oz Movies

Australian zombie films
1988 films
1988 horror films
Australian television films
1980s English-language films